USS Redwing is a name the United States Navy has used more than once in naming its vessels:

  , a minesweeper in naval service 1919–1924.
  , ex-USS Redwing (AM-48) in United States Coast Guard service 1924–1943.
  , a minesweeper in naval service 1955–1959.
  , a large harbor tugboat in naval service 1965–2003.

See also 
 , a United States Bureau of Fisheries fishery patrol vessel in commission from 1928 to 1939

References 

United States Navy ship names